Harald Wurm (born 8 September 1984) was an Austrian cross-country skier.
He started for the WSV Vomp until 2015, when he was banned by the Austrian Anti-Doping Legal Committee for four years for using cobalt.

World Cup results
All results are sourced from the International Ski Federation (FIS).

World Cup standings

References

External links

1984 births
Cross-country skiers at the 2006 Winter Olympics
Cross-country skiers at the 2014 Winter Olympics
Doping cases in cross-country skiing
Living people
Olympic cross-country skiers of Austria
Austrian sportspeople in doping cases
Austrian male cross-country skiers
People from Schwaz
Sportspeople from Tyrol (state)
21st-century Austrian people